Yuriel Darío Celi Guerrero (born 20 February 2002) is a Peruvian footballer who plays as a midfielder for Club Universitario de Deportes on loan from Hull City.

Career statistics

Club

Notes

References

2002 births
Living people
Peruvian footballers
Peru youth international footballers
Association football midfielders
Club Universitario de Deportes footballers
Hull City A.F.C. players
Academia Deportiva Cantolao players
Sportspeople from Callao